Nikolett Listár (born December 6, 1983 in Székesfehérvár, Hungary) is a Hungarian sprinter, her main events are 100m and 200m.
 Team: Alba Régia Atlétikai Klub (ARAK), Székesfehérvár.
 Trainer: Tamas Varga
 Personal bests:
 100m 11.71 Izmir  2005 
 200m 23.19 Erfurt 2005

Achievements

References 
Nikolett Listár profile at all-athletics.com

2005 European Athletics U23 Championships
2008 IAAF World Indoor Championships – Women's 400 metres
List of Hungarian Athletics Outdoor Championships winners (women)
List of Hungarian Athletics Indoor Championships winners (women)

1983 births
Living people
Hungarian female sprinters
Universiade medalists in athletics (track and field)
Universiade bronze medalists for Hungary
Medalists at the 2005 Summer Universiade
Sportspeople from Székesfehérvár